Amy Butler is an American ordained Christian minister, served 938 days as Interim Senior Minister from June 14, 2020 to January 8, 2023 at National City Christian Church, the National Church Of The Christian Church (Disciples Of Christ) in Washington D.C.

From June 8, 2014 to July 11, 2019, Butler served as the senior minister at The Riverside Church, a United Church of Christ/American Baptist church in New York City, the first woman to hold that position in the church's history.

From 2003 to 2014, Butler led Calvary Baptist Church in Washington D.C., also the first woman to hold that position in the church's history.

Education and career 

Butler attended Baylor University, where she earned a Bachelor of Arts in 1991 and a Master of Arts in 1996. She also holds a Bachelor of Theology from the International Baptist Theological Seminary (IBTS) in Ruschlikon, Switzerland, and a Doctor of Ministry degree from Wesley Theological Seminary.

Following her graduation from IBTS, Butler led a homeless shelter in New Orleans, Louisiana through the Cooperative Baptist Fellowship and served on the staff of Lindy's Place, a transitional housing facility, providing support for women coming out of homelessness. Butler then became Associate Pastor of Membership and Mission at St. Charles Avenue Baptist Church, also in New Orleans.

In 2003, Butler became Senior Minister of Calvary Baptist Church in Washington, DC, the founding church of the Northern Baptist Convention, now American Baptist Churches USA. As Calvary's first female Senior Minister, Butler helped Calvary more than triple in membership. Her work at Calvary was featured in Paul Nixon's book We Refused to Lead a Dying Church!: Churches That Came Back Against All Odds. She held this position until 2014, at which time she accepted the Senior Minister position at The Riverside Church.

The Riverside Church 

Butler was elected to the senior minister position at Riverside on June 8, 2014. In July 2019, after Butler completed an initial five-year term at the church, it was announced that the church's governing body would not be extending Butler's term for an additional five years. The official announcement described the decision as mutual. Later reports, however, cited retaliation against Butler for a harassment claim she had filed against a Church Council member who was accused of sexually harassing her and other female staff members, a visit to an education-based, sex toy store by Butler, two church employees, and a congregant during an out-of-town conference trip, and her request during the contract renewal negotiations to be compensated the same as her male predecessor as well as have protections put in place to guard staff against church leaders who engaged in practices of harassment and bullying as potentially contributing factors in the governing body's decision. A former church council member also revealed that although the Church Council had conducted a full and comprehensive investigation into the lay leader accused of sexually harassing female staff members, the governing body voted to terminate their relationship with Butler after an investigation that seemed rushed and poorly documented by comparison into complaints leveled against her by unnamed staff members.

Personal life 

Butler was raised in Hawaii and is the mother of three children.  She is divorced.

References 

Year of birth missing (living people)
Living people
Religious leaders from Hawaii
Clergy from New York City
Wesley Theological Seminary alumni
Women Christian clergy
Baylor University alumni
21st-century Baptist ministers from the United States